The John Lennon Video Collection is a music video album compilation that was released on VHS, VCD and LaserDisc in October 1992 in the US, UK, Europe, Australia and New Zealand as a collection of old and new promotional videos.

The collection is significant for containing most of the original versions of Lennon's music videos, before Yoko Ono remade and re-edited them for the Lennon Legend: The Very Best of John Lennon DVD in 2003.

Content
The video compilation contains 19 music videos from Lennon's solo career, 16 of which had never been commercially available.

Six of the videos were specially made by Yoko Ono for this release from archival material.

Track listing
All track notes taken from the video end credits.

Charts

References 

1992 compilation albums
1992 video albums
John Lennon compilation albums
Music video compilation albums